The law of Luxembourg is civil law. From the Tenth Century to the Fifteenth Century the law of the Grand Duchy was customary law.

Constitution

There were constitutions of 1841, 1848, 1856 and 1868. The constitution was revised in 1919, 1948 and 1987.

Legislation
The legislature is the Chamber of Deputies.

Legislation includes règlements grand-ducaux.

List of legislation

List of codes:
Code of Criminal Procedure (French: Code de procédure pénale)
Commercial Code (French: Code de commerce)
Labour Code
Penal Code

Other legislation:
Education Law of 1912
Law on euthanasia and assisted suicide (2009)

Courts and judiciary

There is a Constitutional Court.

Legal practitioners
Practitioners include avocats. There is professional secrecy.

Criminal law

There is a Penal Code of 1879 and a Code of Criminal Procedure (French: Code de procédure pénale; formerly called Code d'instruction criminelle).

Company and partnership law
A special limited partnership is possible.

Labour law
There is a Labour Code.

See also
Taxation in Luxembourg

References
Verbeke, Christian F. In Winterton and Moys (eds). Information Sources in Law. Second Edition. Bowker-Saur. 1997. Chapter Seventeen: Luxembourg. Pages 293 to 305.
Paul Graulich (ed). Guide to Foreign Legal Materials: Belgium, Luxembourg, Netherlands. Parker School of Foreign and Comparative Law, Columbia University in the city of New York. 1968. Google
Catherine Bourin, Christian Deprez and Dean Spielmann. Bibliographie juridique luxembourgeoise 1997-2013. Bruylant. 2015.
Roger Maul. Bibliographie du droit luxembourgeois. Larcier. Brussels. 1967. Google
Nicolas Majerus. Histoire du droit dans le Grand-Duché de Luxembourg. 1949. WorldCat
Gontier-Grigy. Les vingt-cinq codes de la législation luxembourgeoise. 1884. Google
D A Gontier. Codes de la législation du Grand-Duché de Luxembourg. 1843. Google
Nicole Van Crombrugghe, Guy Arendt and Alexis Maitland Hudson. Belgium and Luxembourg: Practical Commercial Law. (European Commercial Law Series) Longman. 1992. Google
Luxembourg Commercial Law. Rector Press. 1994.
Kremer and Lebbe. Collective Investment Schemes in Luxembourg: Law and Practice. OUP. 1st Ed. 2009. 2nd Ed. 2014.
Judge Advocate Division, Headquarters, USAREUR. Luxembourg Law and the NATO Status of Forces Agreement. Office of the Judge Advocate, Headquarters, US Army, Europe. 12 July 1955. 
E P Youngman. Mining Laws of Luxembourg. (Information Circular 6702) Department of Commerce, United States Bureau of Mines. April 1933. Google
Stephanie Law and Vincent Richard. "Public and Private Enforcement of Consumer Law in Luxembourg". Public and Private Enforcement of Consumer Law – Insights for Luxembourg. Nomos. 2021. Google. Pages 345 to 383.
Chaouche. Legitimate expectations in Luxembourg Tax Law. Editions Larcier. 2019. 
Banque Commerciale, Luxemburg. Holding companies Under Luxembourg law. Google National Union Catalog
Alex Schmitt, "Luxembourg: Clarification of bank secrecy in tax law" (1970) Journal of International Law
Jacques Kauffman. Professional secrecy of bankers in Luxembourg law. 1991.
André Marc. Employment Law in Luxembourg. Allen & Overy. 2007. 4th Ed. 2019.
J M Didier. The Law and Practice relating to Pollution Control in Belgium and Luxembourg. Graham & Trotman. 1st Ed. 1976.
L P Suetens & Dirk Soetemans. The Law and Practice relating to Pollution Control in Belgium and Luxembourg. Graham & Trotman. 2nd Ed. 1983.

External links
Guide to Law Online - Luxembourg

Law of Luxembourg